The Biodiversity Heritage Library for Europe (BHL-Europe) was a three-year (2009–2012) EU project aimed to the coordination of digitization of literature on biodiversity. It involved 28 major natural history museums, botanical gardens, libraries and other European institutions. BHL-Europe was founded in Berlin in May 2009 and regarded itself as a European partner project of the Biodiversity Heritage Library (BHL) project, which was founded in 2005 and initially formed by ten (since 2009, twelve) United States and British libraries.

BHL-Europe was a best practice network. Important components were the coordination of digitization and the creation of appropriate infrastructure, as well as the consolidation of various European digitization projects under a common centralized and multilingual BHL portal. The scope was to make available the digitized literature under Open Access and Creative Commons licenses, and to improve its searchability (using OCR).

BHL-Europe was also responsible for the creation of structures for long-term storage of digital information (durability of digital data).

Composition of BHL-Europe

The following 28 institutions functioned in May 2009 in Berlin as the founding members of the consortium of BHL-Europe:

 Museum für Naturkunde (Berlin) (project leadership)
 Natural History Museum (London)
 National Museum (Prague)
 European Digital Library Foundation (Europeana)
 Angewandte Informationstechnik Forschungsgesellschaft AIT (Graz)
 Atos Origin Integration France (Paris)
 Freie Universität Berlin
 Georg-August-Universität Göttingen (AnimalBase)
 Naturhistorisches Museum Wien
 Oberösterreichische Landesmuseen (Linz)
 Museum and Institute of Zoology, Polish Academy of Sciences (Warszawa)
 Hungarian Natural History Museum (Budapest)
 University of Copenhagen
 Naturalis (Leiden)
 National Botanic Garden of Belgium - Meise
 Royal Museum for Central Africa (Tervuren)
 Royal Belgian Institute of Natural Sciences
 Bibliothèque nationale de France (Paris) (Gallica)
 Museum national d'histoire naturelle (Paris)
 Spanish National Research Council (Madrid)
 Università degli Studi di Firenze
 Royal Botanic Garden Edinburgh
 Species 2000
 John Wiley & Sons
 Smithsonian Institution (Washington)
 Missouri Botanical Garden (St. Louis)
 University of Helsinki
 Humboldt-Universität zu Berlin

External links 
 http://www.bhl-europe.eu
 https://www.biodiversitylibrary.org
 http://www.bhl-china.org

References 

Discipline-oriented digital libraries
World Digital Library
Archival science
Mass digitization